Spring Handicap is a 1937 British comedy film directed by Herbert Brenon and starring Will Fyffe, Maire O'Neill and Billy Milton. The film was made by the Associated British Picture Corporation at their Elstree Studios and based on the play The Last Coupon by Ernest E. Bryan.

Premise
A wife tries to prevent her husband, a miner, from gambling away the money he receives as an inheritance.

Cast
 Will Fyffe as Jack Clayton
 Maire O'Neill as Meg Clayton
 Billy Milton as Len Redpath
 Aileen Marson as Barbara Clayton
 Frank Pettingell as Scullion
 David Burns as Amos
 Hugh Miller as Selby
 Beatrice Varley as Mrs. Tulip
 Wilfrid Hyde White as Hawkins (uncredited)

References

Bibliography
 Chibnall, Steve. Quota Quickies: The Birth of the British 'B' film. British Film Institute, 2007.
 Low, Rachael. History of the British Film: Filmmaking in 1930s Britain. George Allen & Unwin, 1985 .
 Warren, Patricia. Elstree: The British Hollywood. Columbus Books, 1998.

External links

1937 films
1937 comedy films
British comedy films
1930s English-language films
Films shot at Associated British Studios
Films directed by Herbert Brenon
British films based on plays
British black-and-white films
1930s British films